NK Iskra, commonly known as Iskra Bugojno or just Iskra (meaning "spark" in Bosnian) is a professional association football club from the town of Bugojno that is situated in central Bosnia and Herzegovina. Iskra plays its home matches on the Jaklić Stadium which has a capacity of 12,000 seats.

History
Founded in 1946, the club spent most of its history playing in lower Yugoslav divisions. Its greatest success in the Yugoslav period was winning the 1983–84 Yugoslav Second League West division, and participating in the 1984–85 Yugoslav First League, their only top level season during that period. Although they were immediately relegated in the 1984–85 season, they won the 1985 Mitropa Cup.

After the breakup of Yugoslavia, Iskra played several seasons in the Premier League of Bosnia and Herzegovina, but since the 2018–19 season, the club has been playing in the Second League of the Federation of Bosnia and Herzegovina (Group West), one of two third-tier divisions in the country.

Honours

Domestic

League
Yugoslav Second League:
Winners (1): 1983–84 
Second League of Bosnia and Herzegovina:
Winners (1): 1997–98 
Second League of the Federation of Bosnia and Herzegovina:
Winners (2): 2006–07 , 2016–17

European
Mitropa Cup:
Winners (1): 1984–85

Club seasons
Sources:

Historical list of coaches

  Blagoje Bratić
  Rajko Rašević (1980-1983)
  Franjo Džidić (1988-1990)
  Boris Bračulj
  Mesud Duraković 
  Nedzad Selimović (2011-2012)
  Salim Duraković (2012)
  Ibrahim Zukanović (2012-2013)
  Salim Duraković (2013)
  Mesud Duraković (2013)
  Sead Seferović (19 Jul 2013-2014)
  Šener Bajramović (2014)
  Sead Seferović (2014-2016)
  Senid Kulaš (2017)
  Salim Duraković (25 Sep 2017-2018)
  Adis Obad (9 Apr 2018-2018)
  Safet Kmetaš (2018-2019)

References

External links
NK Iskra Bugojno at Facebook 

 
Association football clubs established in 1946
Football clubs in Bosnia and Herzegovina
Football clubs in Yugoslavia
Bugojno
Sport in the Federation of Bosnia and Herzegovina
1946 establishments in Bosnia and Herzegovina